Lynn Wyatt (née Sakowitz; born July 16, 1935) is a Houston socialite, philanthropist and third-generation Texan. Her grandfather and great-uncle started the Sakowitz Department Store chain. Her husband, Oscar Wyatt, is an energy executive, the founder of Houston's Coastal Corporation—now owned by El Paso Corporation —and current CEO of NuCoastal LLC. Lynn and Oscar Wyatt have four sons.

During the height of the oil boom in the 1970s/early 1980s, the family mansion in Houston was known as the "Wyatt Hyatt" becoming a "home away from home" for people including Princess Margaret, Princess Grace of Monaco, Bill Blass, Joan Collins, Mick Jagger, King Hussein and Queen Noor of Jordan.

Personal life 
Wyatt is the daughter of Bernard and Ann Baum Sakowitz (July 28, 1913 - January 18, 2010, San Antonio), a prominent couple in Houston's Jewish circles. They were married in July 1933. Ann was once in negotiations with Louis B. Meyer for a movie acting contract, but abandoned it on Bernard's objection. They also had a son, Robert T. Sakowitz (born c. 1939), known as the merchant prince of Houston. The Sakowitz family owned the Sakowitz fashion specialty stores. Oscar Wyatt and Robert Sakowitz did not get along.

Lynn Sakowitz has been married twice. Her first husband was Robert Lipman and they had two sons together. Lipman was convicted of killing a woman during a drug overdose and served six years in prison for manslaughter. In 1963, Lynn Sakowitz Lipman married oil magnate Oscar Wyatt. She became his fourth wife, and he adopted both her sons from her previous marriage, giving them his name. The elder of them, Steve Wyatt, would become famous for his friendship with the British royal family, particularly Sarah, Duchess of York. Lynn and Oscar Wyatt raised four sons together, Steven Bradford Wyatt, Douglas Bryan Wyatt (born c. 1957), Oscar Sherman "Trey" Wyatt III, and Bradford Allington Wyatt.

Sakowitz stores 
Eastern European Jewish immigrants Tobias Sakowitz and brother Simon founded Sakowitz Bros. specialty department store in 1902, in Galveston, Texas. The business thrived and expanded in the first  half of the twentieth century. Their first Houston start started in 1908. The Sakowitz brothers became leaders in Houston's Jewish community, chairing the building campaign of Congregation Beth Israel, in 1922 and 1923. Both later served terms as president of the congregation.

In the early 1950s, Tobias was still at the helm, and opened a number of major stores, including a 254,000 square foot, Alfred Charles Flynn-designed flagship store at the northeast corner of Main and Dallas Streets in downtown Houston. Nine other stores followed in Texas, and eight others in Oklahoma and Arizona.

In 1957, Tobias' son Bernard took over the chain. Eighteen years later, Bernard's son Robert took over, Lynn and Robert nominally ran the business together upon the death of their father in 1981, but Lynn claimed to be a mostly passive partner.

Robert's reign was short-lived. In 1985, the company filed for bankruptcy protection. It took on an Australian construction company, L.J. Hooker as a partner. After the 1987 stock market crash, sales plummeted at the stores, and an Australian interest rate jump pushed Hooker into bankruptcy, too. Sakowitz, Inc. closed in 1990.

In 1991, a family rift between the Wyatts and Sakowitzes over its disposition went to court. Lynn's children claimed Robert had pilfered the company assets, driving it out of business, but Robert countered that Lynn had been part of the business investment approval process. Their mother, Ann, sided with Robert, and was forced to give up a stipend provided by the business due to the lawsuit. The Sakowitzes won the suit, but a judge set it aside. After a federal injunction blocking the retrial, the families settled out of court.

Robert Sakowitz continued as a business magnate, starting consultants Hazak Corp., in 1991, specializing in business strategies and marketing. He is the CEO In 1998, the downtown location was sold, and turned into The Main Garage, a 490-space parking garage.

Biography
Lynn Wyatt has appeared in American Vogue (magazine), Harper's Bazaar, Town & Country and W (the high-fashion/social magazine of Fairchild Publications) through the years. She was a friend and patron of couturiers Valentino, Karl Lagerfeld, Emanuel Ungaro, Bill Blass, Jean Paul Gaultier and others. She was inducted into the International Best Dressed List Hall of Fame in 1977. 

In 1982 the Government of France honored her with admission to the prestigious Order of Arts and Letters, rank of Chevalier, for her significant contribution to the enrichment of the French cultural inheritance. In 2007, the French government promoted her to the Order's rank of Officier. 

She received the Woodson Medal from the Houston Forum.  Twice she was named Houston's Most Fascinating by the Texas Medical Center Library. In May 1980 Texas Governor William P. Clements commissioned her as Ambassador of Goodwill for the state. In 2000 she was recognized as "Socialite of the Century" by Texas Monthly magazine. She was later declared a Cadillac Texas Legend by KHOU/Channel 11, the CBS affiliate in Houston. 

To benefit the Red Cross and the American Hospital of Paris, she chaired the annual Bal de la Rose in Monaco, turning it into an entire weekend of festivities. Prince Rainier asked her to be a Founding Trustee of the Princess Grace Foundation U.S.A. (on which Board she continues to serve) and to chair the inaugural Gala in Washington, D.C., for President Ronald Reagan and his wife Nancy. She was appointed to the Board of the U.S. Naval Academy by President Reagan, serving for eight years. An advisor for the Academy when it first considered accepting women, her duties included inspecting a number of the Navy's ships. She helped raise funds for the Naval Academy. 

Other charitable commitments include Houston Grand Opera (Recipient of the Masterson Award; Member of the Founders' Council for Artistic Excellence, Life Patron and Vice Chairman; she chaired the Opera's record-setting 50th anniversary Golden Jubilee Gala, which raised US$ 2.5 million and brought in internationally recognized stars including Roger Moore, Sarah, Duchess of York, Renée Fleming, Bryn Terfel, Philip Glass and Elton John. A Special Advisor to Professor Luc Montagnier, Nobel laureate in Medicine and Physiology (2008) and President of the World Foundation for Medical Research and Prevention, Wyatt contributes to such charities, among others, as the Elton John AIDS Foundation, The Brilliant Lecture Series' Youth Leadership Program (Chair Emeritus), Star of Hope Mission for the Homeless (Life Trustee and every year, Honorary Trustee of the Trees of Hope benefit gala).

In 2008, she was elected to the inaugural board of the Houston-based Medical Prevention and Research Institute. She has a personal interest in disease prevention, human health and wellness and complementary/integrative medicine. She is a Black Belt First Degree in TaeKwonDo. Additionally, she is passionate about raising awareness for people suffering from vestigial tails, an abnormal growth of cartilage and bone protruding from the vertebrae terminus resulting in what is often referred to as a "human tail".

References

Sources

External links
  National Geographic, March 2006
  Texas Monthly magazine, December 2005
  Friends Fight AIDS Official website of the World Foundation for Medical Research and Prevention
  Official website of Professor Luc Montagnier
  Handbook of Texas Online: Bernard Sakowitz

1935 births
Living people
Philanthropists from Texas
American socialites
American people of Jewish descent
Chevaliers of the Ordre des Arts et des Lettres